Tual Trainini (born 11 June 1985) is a French rugby referee.

Career

Trainini has been officiating professionally since 2011 and has been refereeing in the French Top 14 since the 2015–16 Top 14 season. He has been a regular referee in the European Rugby Champions Cup and EPCR Challenge Cup also.

References

Living people
1985 births
French rugby union referees
United Rugby Championship referees